Zane Michael Floyd  (born September 20, 1975) is an American convicted mass murderer who at the age of 23 killed four people and injured another in a supermarket in Las Vegas, Nevada, on June 3, 1999. After being convicted of the murders, Floyd was sentenced to death by a Clark County jury.

Background
After attending high school, Floyd enlisted in the United States Marine Corps. He was honorably discharged in 1998 due to heavy drinking and was told he was not welcome to re-enlist. Before the shooting that led to his conviction, he worked as a security guard and part-time as a bouncer at a bar. Days before the crime, he was fired from his security officer job and evicted from his apartment, moving back into a room at his parent’s home. According to testimony during the penalty phase of his trial, Floyd may have suffered from fetal alcohol syndrome.

The massacre
On June 3, 1999, at approximately 5:15 in the morning, Floyd entered an Albertson's supermarket located at 3864 West Sahara Avenue in Las Vegas and opened fire on random individuals in the store using a shotgun.

Floyd first shot 40-year-old worker Thomas Darnell in the back, killing him. Immediately after, he also killed 41-year-old store manager Carlos Chuck Leos and 31-year-old worker Dennis Troy Sargent. Floyd then encountered 23-year-old worker Zachary T. Emenegger, who fled from Floyd when he saw the gunman pointing the shotgun in his direction, beginning a sequence of near-death encounters with the gunman. Diving under a produce table, Emenegger avoided Floyd's gunfire for 15 seconds but ultimately was shot in the upper-chest region resulting in a punctured lung. Floyd then saw Emenegger move and shot him again. Emenegger then played dead. Believing his victim was dead, Floyd whispered, "Yeah, you're dead," and continued searching the store. Eventually, Floyd discovered 60-year-old clerk Lucille Alice Tarantino in the rear of the store and fatally shot her in the head at point-blank range. Thinking that Floyd was gone, Emenegger attempted to get up and go for help but collapsed back onto the ground. Floyd initially walked past Emenegger's motionless body and started to leave the store but abruptly stopped and doubled back to ensure Emenegger was dead. After watching for a moment, Floyd finally fled from the store. In total, Floyd had shot seven shotgun shells in seven minutes, killing four people and critically wounding Emenegger.

It later emerged that shortly before the shooting, Floyd had telephoned an escort agency and called for the services of a young woman at his apartment. When a 20-year-old woman arrived at the apartment at around 3:30 am, Floyd, threatened her with a shotgun and raped her. He eventually told her she had 60 seconds to run or be killed. After she escaped, Floyd took his shotgun and began walking to the supermarket at around 5:00 am.

Arrest
Floyd left through the supermarket's north doors to meet the Las Vegas Metropolitan Police Department, who had been called by an employee who had been upstairs and believed there was a robbery in progress. Without exchanging any gunfire, Floyd ran back into the supermarket and left through the west doors, hoping to avoid the police outside. When he noticed officers surrounding the complex, Floyd threatened to kill himself, pointing the shotgun to his head. After an eight-minute standoff, police convinced him to surrender. They immediately arrested him on charges of murder.

When questioned by police, Floyd confessed to the killings and said he committed the murders because he had always wanted to know what it was like to kill someone.

Trial
Jurors at Floyd’s trial heard his confession and watched the video from store surveillance cameras. Floyd did not testify at the three-day trial, where Emenegger testified against him. On July 13, 2000, after deliberating for little more than two hours, the jury convicted him of four counts of first degree murder with use of a deadly weapon, four counts of sexual assault with use of a deadly weapon, and single counts of burglary while in possession of a firearm, attempted murder with use of a deadly weapon, and first-degree kidnapping with use of a deadly weapon.

The jury rendered a sentence of death for each count of murder, finding that the aggravating circumstances outweighed any mitigating circumstances. For the other seven offenses, the district court imposed the maximum terms in prison, to be served consecutively. The court also ordered restitution totaling more than 180,000 dollars.

Appeals
Floyd filed a direct appeal to the Nevada Supreme Court, which affirmed his conviction and sentence in March 2002. In 2003, the U.S. Supreme Court denied certiorari. Floyd subsequently filed a petition for a writ of habeas corpus in the state district court. The petition was denied, and the Nevada Supreme Court affirmed the denial on appeal.

Floyd then pursued a pro se habeas petition in the U.S. District Court for the District of Nevada, challenging his conviction and death sentence. The court stayed federal proceedings pending exhaustion of certain claims in state court, prompting Floyd to file a second state habeas petition in state district court. The state district court denied relief in April 2009. The Nevada Supreme Court affirmed that Floyd's second petition was untimely and successive. The U.S. District Court lifted the stay in March 2011. Floyd filed a second amended petition for a writ of habeas corpus. In December 2014, the U.S. District Court partially granted the State's motion to dismiss and denied Floyd's remaining claims on the merits; however, it issued a certificate of appealability as to several issues.

Consequently, Floyd appealed the United States Ninth Circuit Court of Appeals. In October 2019, a three-judge panel of the Ninth Circuit affirmed the district court's denial of Floyd's habeas petition. Floyd's ensuing petition for panel rehearing and rehearing en banc was denied. In July 2020, he filed a petition for certiorari with the U.S. Supreme Court, challenging the Ninth Circuit's application of the Strickland standard. That petition was denied in November 2020.

Scheduled execution
In April 2021, Floyd challenged Nevada's use of lethal injection, arguing that it is cruel and unusual and that, if he is to be put to death, he would prefer the use of a firing squad. Floyd was scheduled to be executed on July 26, 2021, via lethal injection. However, a federal judge stayed the execution, and ruled that the state needed more time to determine the constitutionality of the lethal injection drugs that would be used for Floyd's execution. If executed, Floyd would have been the first person to be executed in Nevada in over fifteen years, since Daryl Mack was executed in 2006. Floyd's execution was once again stayed by Nevada U.S. District Court Judge Richard Boulware II on February 14, 2022, when Nevada chief deputy Attorney General Randall Gilmer told the court that Clark County prosecutors had not obtained the federal death warrant needed in time to carry out the execution by February 28, when the states current supply of ketamine, one of four drugs used in lethal injections in Nevada, expires.

See also
 List of death row inmates in the United States

References

Living people
1975 births
1999 murders in the United States
American people convicted of murder
American mass murderers
American prisoners sentenced to death
Attacks on supermarkets
People convicted of murder by Nevada
Prisoners sentenced to death by Nevada
Criminals from Nevada
United States Marines